Raymond Ackerman (born 10 March 1931) is a South African businessman, who purchased the Pick 'n Pay supermarket group from its founder. He purchased four stores from Jack Goldin in the 1960s. Raymond Ackerman was chairman until he stepped down in 2010.

Biography
After graduating from the University of Cape Town with a Bachelor of Commerce, he joined the Greatermans group in the Ackermans division in 1951 at the age of 20 as a trainee manager. Ackermans had been founded just after World War I by his father Gus, but was sold to the Greatermans group in 1940.

Ackerman was eventually offered a position at Greatermans head office in Johannesburg. In the early 1950s, food retailing supermarkets first began to appear on the scene in South Africa. Norman Herber, chairman of Greatermans decided to start a food retailer called Checkers. Ackerman was eventually put in charge of Checkers, making a resounding success of the business.

Ackerman won the Outstanding Young South African award in 1965, along with Gary Player and by 1966, at the age of 35, he was the managing director of 85 Checkers stores; however, he was fired in the same year. In response, using his severance pay and a bank loan, Ackerman bought four stores in Cape Town trading under the name Pick 'n Pay. Under his leadership, Pick 'n Pay eventually grew into one of Africa's largest supermarket chains, with a thirty seven billion Rand turnover (2006 figure) and more than 124 supermarkets, 14 hypermarkets and 179 franchised outlets. The Pick 'n Pay Group employs more than 30,000 people in several African countries.

Family 
Pick 'n Pay is a business giant run as a family business. His wife Wendy and his four children, Suzanne, Kathryn, Jonathan, and Gareth, all work for Pick 'n Pay or for its charity. On 21 October 2009, Gareth took over his father's duties, and on 1 March 2010, the chairmanship as well.

Consumer rights and community engagement 
Ackerman campaigned heavily for consumer rights. He lobbied Anton Rupert for cheaper cigarette prices and with the government over the price of bread. His biggest fight was with the authorities to deregulate gasoline prices, though this was unsuccessful. To keep prices low, the firm imports branded products. The Ackerman family's support for the Red Cross War Memorial Children's Hospital dates to Gus's involvement in funding its establishment in 1956. In 2006, the Ackermans donated R4 million to the hospital. Pick 'n Pay was very involved with Cape Town's bid to bring the 2004 Summer Olympics to South Africa. On 14 February 2005, the Raymond Ackerman Academy of Entrepreneurial Development opened in Cape Town to develop business skills and train future managers and leaders for South Africa.

Awards
He received an honorary doctorate in law from Rhodes University in 1986. His alma mater, the University of Cape Town, awarded him an honorary doctorate in commerce in 2001. He was voted 79th in the Top 100 Great South Africans in 2004. In November 2004, the Financial Times named him the only South African among the world's 100 greatest business leaders. In South Africa, he is often ranked with Harry Oppenheimer and Anton Rupert. Ackerman, together with his wife Wendy were awarded the 2010 David Rockefeller Bridging Leadership in Africa Award by The Synergos Institute Southern Africa office.

Books 
Raymond Ackerman published three books on his experiences and with advice for young entrepreneurs.

 Ackerman, Raymond: Hearing Grasshoppers Jump street . The story of Raymond Ackerman as told to Denise Prichard. Cape Town: David Philip, 2004. 
 Ackerman, Raymond: The Four Legs of the Table. Raymond Ackerman's simple, straight-forward formula for success as told to Denise Prichard. Cape Town: David Philip, 2005. 
 Ackerman, Raymond: A Spat to Catch a Mackerel. Key Principles to build your business. Cape Town: Jonathan Ball, 2010.

Bibliography 
 Gerber, Amelda: "Entrepreneurs kry nuwe leerskool. Raymond Ackerman verskaf geld om sentrum by sakeskool te vestig." Die Burger, 15 February 2005.
 Die Burger, 9 March 2006.
 La Vita, Murray: "Mister A. moet nou groet." Die Burger, 12 March 2010.

References

1931 births
Living people
South African people of British descent
Alumni of Diocesan College, Cape Town
South African businesspeople
University of Cape Town alumni
White South African people